Greenwood station may refer to:

Greenwood station (Mississippi), an Amtrak station in Greenwood, Mississippi
Greenwood station (MBTA), a commuter rail station in Wakefield, Massachusetts
Greenwood station (Toronto), a subway station in Toronto, Ontario
Greenwood railway station, a commuter rail station in Perth, Western Australia

See also
 Greenwood Yard, a Toronto Transit Commission subway train yard